Akira Hori (堀晃, born 1944 in Tatsuno, Hyogo) is a Japanese science fiction writer. He has been involved in science fiction since high school and has a degree from Osaka University in engineering. He won the first Nihon SF Taisho Award in 1980  and has also won the Seiun Award.

Works in English translation
 "Open Up" (Speculative Japan 2, Kurodahan Press, 2011)

References

External links
Akira Hori's website (In Japanese)
SFWJ profile

1944 births
Japanese science fiction writers
People from Hyōgo Prefecture
Living people
Osaka University alumni